Marie Van Brittan Brown (October 30, 1922 – February 2, 1999) was an American nurse and  innovator. In 1966, she invented a video home security system along with her husband Albert Brown, an electronics technician. In the same year, they applied for a patent for their innovative security system, which was granted in 1969. Her innovation has had a huge impact on the entire security system. Her idea has expanded beyond just security for those at home, and her ideas can be seen with security systems in businesses around the world. Brown was born in Jamaica, Queens, New York; she died there at the age of 76 in 1999.

Early life 
Marie Van Brittan Brown's father was born in Massachusetts and her mother was from Pennsylvania. Both were African-American. Not much is known about the early life of Marie. Marie married an electrician named Albert Brown. Marie and her husband lived at 151–158 & 135th Avenue in Jamaica, Queens, New York. She worked as a nurse and her husband was an electrician, so they did not always have normal hours or simultaneously work. Her mother, father and grandmother all had the nickname "Dee Dee". She did not have any siblings. Marie and Brown had two children, a boy named Albert Jr. and a girl named Norma. Norma followed in her mother's footsteps and became a nurse and inventor. She had success in the innovative field as well as her mother, as she had over 10 inventions.

Brown died on February 2, 1999, at the age of seventy-six.

Home Security System 
Due to the fact that Marie was a nurse and her husband Albert was an electrician, they both had irregular work hours, and often their work hours would not overlap. This would lead to many nights where Marie was left alone in her home at night. The crime rate in her neighborhood was very high, and inspired by the prolonged length of time it took the police to arrive in her neighborhood, Brown invented the first home security system. At the time, Brown was forty years old.

When Marie and her husband first came up with their security system, their invention consisted of four peepholes, a sliding camera, TV monitors, and microphones. The cameras could go from peephole to peephole. These cameras were connected to the TV monitors inside her home, and using those TV monitors, Marie could see exactly who was at her door, without having to physically be at the door and without having to actually open the door. The microphones also played a vital part in her invention, as with them she could talk with whoever was outside, again without actually having to open the door and be face to face with whoever was there. As was said earlier, Marie lived in an area with high crime, and this invention she created would allow her to feel much more safe inside her home. She no longer has to open up the door to see who is there, but rather she can see from the safety of her house who is there.

On August 1, 1966, Marie and her husband submitted a patent application for her invention. It would be the first patent of its kind, and her husband's name was below hers. The patent was granted by the government on December 2, 1969, and four days later, the New York Times ran an article about her invention.

Response 
At first, the invention was difficult to sell to homebuilders because the cost of implementation was so high. The Browns initially decided to build it in their own home hoping that would spark interest in home builders. To help expand her innovation even further, Marie added in a system in which you could unlock the door using a remote. This made it so she did not have to physically get up to go to the door to unlock it, but rather could unlock the door with the click of a button, still sitting down. Marie knew this would only help them know who was at the door or attempting to enter the home but would not improve the emergency response time. Knowing that the police or security response was slow she decided that there must be a quicker way for them to alert the authorities. To do so she invented a system that contacted police and emergency responders with just the tap of a button. She and her husband cited other inventors in their patent, such as Edward D. Phinney and Thomas J. Reardon. Even now, over fifty years later, her invention is still being used by smaller businesses and living facilities.

Although the system was originally intended for domestic uses, many businesses began to adopt Brown's system given its efficacy. Brown was recognized for her innovation and received an award from the National Science Committee,  officially making her a part of "an elite group of African-American inventors and scientists." Brown was quoted in the New York Times as saying that with her invention "a woman alone could set off an alarm immediately by pressing a button, or if the system were installed in a doctor's office, it might prevent holdups by drug addicts."

The invention was the first closed-circuit television security system and is the predecessor to modern home systems today. It was the foundation for video monitoring, remote-controlled door locks, push-button alarm triggers, instant messaging to security providers and police, as well as two-way voice communication. Brown's invention has led to the creation of many new home security systems that rely on video systems, remote door locks, and quick emergency response actions. These systems have become the leading security for homes and small businesses all over the world. The fame of Brown's device also led to the more prevalent CCTV surveillance in public areas.

Legacy 
Marie Van Brittan Brown's invention of her home security system has had a huge impact on the security systems in place as a whole. Her idea was extremely innovative; it was her initial idea that allowed people to build upon that idea and create security systems that we still see today. Sade Baderinwa says that "if you have a 'home security system' protecting your home, you have [Marie Van Brittan Brown] to thank" (Baderinwa, 2021). She has revolutionized the entire security system, and this quote means that all security brands such as ADT, Ring, and more all have her to thank for her initial idea. Brown's initial idea has continued to be used to help people around the world feel safer and more secure inside of their homes. She was recognized in the New York Times and received an award from the National Scientists Committee for her work. Unfortunately, Marie van Brittan Brown died before she could see the new innovations added to her invention. But her impact will never be forgotten. Any security system, whether it be at homes, businesses, or banks, can all be traced back to her invention. As more home security systems came to the market, Brown's initial invention became even more influential. Her invention was cited in at least 32 future patent applications. Unfortunately, after her successful patent application in 1969, the media coverage of her product ceased. The home security business is expected to be at least a $1.5B business and is expected to triple by 2024.

References

Further reading

1922 births
1999 deaths
Women inventors
African-American inventors
People from Jamaica, Queens
20th-century American inventors
20th-century African-American people
20th-century African-American women
African-American nurses
American women nurses
Nurses from New York (state)